Epiphanius the Monk (Epiphanius Monachus, Epiphanios of Constantinople, 8th or 9th century) was a monk and priest in the Kallistratos monastery in Constantinople and author of several extant works including a life of the Virgin Mary and a life of St. Andrew the Apostle (PG 120.179–286). He published the first guidebook of Jerusalem for traveling pilgrims in Greek; there is also a Slavonic translation.

References 

Eastern Orthodox monks
Roman Catholic monks
Year of death unknown
Year of birth unknown